The 2006 WNBA Season was the Women's National Basketball Association's tenth season. The league added one team the Chicago Sky. The Sky was the first expansion team since 2000 when the Indiana Fever, Miami Sol, Portland Fire, and the Seattle Storm came to the WNBA. On April 5 the WNBA held their draft. Seimone Augustus, guard out of Louisiana State University was the number one overall pick. She was selected by the Minnesota Lynx. Cappie Pondexter, guard out of Rutgers University went number two. She was selected by the Phoenix Mercury. The season started on May 20 with a game between Sacramento Monarchs and Phoenix Mercury. The game was televised by ABC. The Monarchs won the game 105–78. On July 12, The All Star Game was held at Madison Square Garden in New York City, New York. The East All Stars defeated the Western All Stars 98–82. Katie Douglas of the Connecticut Sun was named MVP in the game with her 16 points, 5 rebounds, 4 assists. The 2006 WNBA season concluded on August 13. Lisa Leslie of the Los Angeles Sparks won the league MVP. Mike Thibault of the Connecticut Sun was named Coach of The Year. Seimone Augustus of the Minnesota Lynx was named Rookie of the Year. The season ended with the Detroit Shock winning their second WNBA Championship.

Regular season standings
Eastern Conference

Western Conference

Season award winners

Playoffs

Coaches

Eastern Conference
Charlotte Sting: Muggsy Bogues
Chicago Sky: Dave Cowens
Connecticut Sun: Mike Thibault
Detroit Shock: Bill Laimbeer
Indiana Fever: Brian Winters
New York Liberty: Pat Coyle
Washington Mystics: Richie Adubato

Western Conference
Houston Comets: Van Chancellor
Los Angeles Sparks: Joe Bryant
Minnesota Lynx: Suzie McConnell-Serio and Carolyn Jenkins
Phoenix Mercury: Paul Westhead
Sacramento Monarchs: John Whisenant
San Antonio Silver Stars: Dan Hughes
Seattle Storm: Anne Donovan

External links
2006 WNBA Final Standings
2006 WNBA Playoffs
2006 WNBA Draft
Box Score of the First Game of the 2006 WNBA season
Box Score of the 2006 WNBA All Star Game
Katie Douglas MVP of the 2006 All Star Game
2006 WNBA Award Winners

 
2006 in American women's basketball
2006–07 in American basketball by league
2005–06 in American basketball by league
Women's National Basketball Association seasons